Kuzhbakhty (Qujbaqtı) is a rural locality (a selo) in Kuzhbakhtinsky Selsoviet, Ilishevsky District, Bashkortostan, Russia. The population was 372 as of 2010. There are 7 streets.

Geography 
Kuzhbakhty is located 31 km northeast of Verkhneyarkeyevo (the district's administrative centre) by road. Tazeyevo is the nearest rural locality.

References 

Rural localities in Ilishevsky District